The 2023 Myanmar National League will be the fourteenth season of first-division domestic football in Myanmar. It will consist of twelve teams, as two teams from the 2022 MNL-2 were promoted.

Shan United are the defending champions after winning their third consecutive title in the 2022 season.

MNL Committee meeting

It has been decided that the 2023 Myanmar National League will be played from the third week of February to the last week of October. The matches are set to be played at Thuwunna Stadium and Yangon United Sports Complex. 

In registration rules it has also been decided that some young players should be in the final registration list for the success of the Myanmar U-23 team in the SEA Games.

Registration lists

Foreign players

Foreign players 

Players name in bold indicates the player was registered during the mid-season transfer window.

Clubs

Personnel and sponsoring
Note: Flags indicate national team as has been defined under FIFA eligibility rules. Players may hold more than one non-FIFA nationality.

League table

Results

Positions by round

Season statistics

Season statistics
 

}

Top scorers
As of March 13, 2023.

Most assists
As of March 13, 2023.

Clean sheets
As of March 17, 2023.

Hat-tricks

Awards

Monthly awards

Tv broadcasters

Sky Net,Channel 9 Myanmar,MNTV Myanmar, Sky Net Sports 123456 HD Channels Myanmar ,

(online Media) 
MNL Youtube Channel,MNL-2 Youtube Channel, Genius Sports, Eleven Sports (Online Media)  MyCujoo (Online Media),Ai soccer (Online Media),Be Soccer (Online Media),  
(Online Media)Sky Net DTH Youtube Channel

References

Myanmar National League seasons
2023 in Myanmar
2023 in Asian association football leagues